David Lee Orr is an American entrepreneur and social media influencer from Effingham, Illinois.  While attending the University of Arizona, Orr was branded an “influencer” by Fast Company magazine for his use of Twitter accounts.

While a teenager, Orr founded the e-commerce website fruper.com and following college he began to focus on social media marketing, primarily via Twitter.  This involved posting on various platforms detailing his personal travel exploits as well as running several parody and humor accounts.

References

Living people
Year of birth missing (living people)
People from Effingham, Illinois
University of Arizona alumni
Social media influencers
American Internet company founders